Kakan (also Romanized as Kākān; also known as Kākūn and Qal‘eh-i-Gokūn) is a village in Pol Beh Bala Rural District, Simakan District, Jahrom County, Fars Province, Iran. At the 2006 census, its population was 529, in 112 families.

References 

Populated places in Jahrom County